Dangerous Waters is an upcoming thriller film directed and written by John Barr.

Cast 
 Odeya Rush
 Saffron Burrows
 Ray Liotta
 Eric Dane

Production 
In May 2022, the film was announced that Odeya Rush will be joined by Saffron Burrows, Eric Dane, and Ray Liotta which is directed and based on a story by John Barr and written by Mark Jackson.

Filming takes place in Dominican Republic.

On May 26, Ray Liotta died in his sleep in Santo Domingo while filming.

References

External links 
 

Upcoming films